In Good Company is an album by pianist George Cables that was recorded in 2015 and released on the HighNote label.

Reception
In JazzTimes, Michael J. West called it " a cheery swinger, an exemplar of mainstream piano jazz. In short, the kind of record Cables always makes".

Track listing 
All compositions by George Cables except where noted
 "After the Morning" (John Hicks) – 8:39
 "Mr. Anonymouse" – 5:03
 "Naima's Love Song" (Hicks) – 6:51
 "It Don't Mean a Thing (If It Ain't Got That Swing)" (Duke Ellington, Irving Mills) – 4:36
 "Lotus Blossom" (Billy Strayhorn) – 8:17
 "Love You Madly" (Ellington) – 6:29
 "EVC" – 6:24
 "Lush Life" (Strayhorn) – 8:12
 "Voyage" (Kenny Barron) – 5:57
 "Day Dream" (Ellington, Strayhorn) – 1:53

Personnel 
George Cables – piano
Essiet Essiet - bass 
Victor Lewis – drums

References 

George Cables albums
2015 albums
HighNote Records albums